The nineteenth series of the British medical drama television series Casualty commenced airing in the United Kingdom on BBC One on 11 September 2004 and finished on 20 August 2005. It saw another increase, this time to 47 episodes. For the Christmas episodes of the series, two cross-over episodes with Holby City were shown, titled as: "Casualty@Holby City".

Cast

Main characters 

Luke Bailey as Sam Bateman (from episode 5)
Ian Bleasdale as Josh Griffiths
Georgina Bouzova as Ellen Zitek (from episode 3)
Louise Brealey as Roxy Bird (until episode 3)
Liz Carling as Selena Donovan (from episode 1)
Maxwell Caulfield as Jim Brodie (until episode 17)
Susan Cookson as Maggie Coldwell (from episode 22)
Elyes Gabel as Guppy Sandhu (from episode 8)
Rebekah Gibbs as Nina Farr
Kwame Kwei-Armah as Fin Newton (until episode 5)
Martina Laird as Comfort Jones
Simon MacCorkindale as Harry Harper
Sarah Manners as Bex Reynolds (until episode 44)
Janine Mellor as Kelsey Phillips (from episode 45)
Suzanne Packer as Tess Bateman
James Redmond as John "Abs" Denham
Derek Thompson as Charlie Fairhead (episodes 18−48)
Will Thorp as Woody Joyner (from episode 14)
Matthew Wait as Luke Warren
Leanne Wilson as Claire Guildford (until episode 48)

Recurring characters 

Sasha Behar as Liz Marcart (episodes 34−37)
Tom Butcher as Tim Gaskill (episodes 34−37)
Thomas Hudson as Jamie Coldwell (episodes 41−45)
Irna Iniss as Ruth Abbott (episodes 10−16)
Adam James as Pete Guildford (episodes 19−43)
Gary Mavers as Will Manning (episodes 1-6 and 30, from episode 40)
Rosemary McHale as Irene Powell (episodes 38−39)
Cassie Raine as Kate Millar (episodes 3−12)
Madhav Sharma as Jas Sandhu (episodes 22−24, from episode 41)
Peter Silverleaf as Colin Evans (until episode 44)
Jack Smethurst as Stan Powell (episodes 38−46)
Christopher Timothy as Karl Ackerman (episodes 3−13)
Peter Watts as Iain Garrick (episodes 29−34)

Guest characters 

Ian Aspinall as Mubbs Hussein (episodes 11 and 17)
Lucy Benjamin as Gina Taylor (episodes 1−2)
Luisa Bradshaw-White as Lisa Fox (special)
Sharon D. Clarke as Lola Griffin (special)
Laura Donnelly as Fleur Butler (from episode 48)
Louis Emerick as Mike Bateman (episodes 25−28)
Peter Forbes as DI Bentham (episodes 10−11)
Natalie Glover as Emma Newton (episodes 3 and 6)
Andrew Greenough as Dave Adams (episodes 7−9)
Julia Hills as Caroline Joyner (episode 14, episodes 26−29)
McFly as themselves (episode 19)
David Michaels as Jeremy Saddler (episodes 27−28)
Tim Plester as Derek Moberley (episode 1)
Melissa Pryer as Eliza Davies (episode 6)
Jane Riley as Joanne Coldwell (episodes 43 and 46)
Christopher Whittingham as Dr James Clifton (episodes 26 and 29)

Episode 17 was the first half of a two-part crossover with Holby City and also featured the following Holby City castmembers:
Amanda Mealing as Connie Beauchamp
Kim Vithana as Rosie Sattar
Hugh Quarshie as Ric Griffin
Jaye Jacobs as Donna Jackson
Dominic Jephcott as Alistair Taylor

Episodes

Special

Notes

References

External links
 Casualty series 19 at the Internet Movie Database

19
2004 British television seasons
2005 British television seasons